Alpha Newspaper Group is a media group, primarily involved in local newspaper publishing and radio broadcasting, in Northern Ireland. The company's headquarters are in Moygashel near Dungannon, County Tyrone.

Ownership

The group is partly owned, and chaired, by businessman and retired Ulster Unionist politician Lord Kilclooney, formerly known as John Taylor.

Alpha Newspaper Group previously owned two newspapers in County Offaly (Tullamore and Midland Tribune) in the Republic of Ireland. In April 2019, Alpha Newspapers sold these titles to Iconic Newspapers subject to regulatory approval.

Titles published

Northern Ireland

Newspapers

 Ballyclare Gazette
 Ballymena Guardian
 Carrickfergus Advertiser
 Larne Gazette
 Northern Constitution
 The Outlook
 Strabane Weekly News and Donegal Reporter
 Tyrone Constitution
 Tyrone Courier
 Ulster Gazette
 Coleraine Chronicle
 Ballymena Chronicle
 Ballycastle Chronicle
 Limavady Chronicle
 Antrim Guardian
 Newry Democrat
   The Ulster Unionist News

Radio stations

Alpha Newspapers, The Irish News and River Media are part of the consortium Northern Media Group, which operates six radio stations in Northern Ireland:

 Five FM
 Six FM
 Seven FM
 Q102.9
 Q101.2
 Q97.2

Former Republic of Ireland
 Midland Tribune (Acquired from Midlands Tribune, sold to Iconic Newspapers)
 Tullamore Tribune (Acquired from Midlands Tribune, sold to Iconic Newspapers)
 Roscommon Champion (Closed)
 Longford News (closed)
 Athlone Voice (closed)

References

External links
 Alpha Newspapers

Newspapers published in Northern Ireland
Mass media companies of Northern Ireland